Junior Olaitan Ishola (born 9 May 2002) is a Beninese professional footballer who plays as a midfielder for French club Niort and the Benin national team.

Club career
Olaitan began his senior career with the Beninese club Ayéma Adjarra, where he scored 10 goals in 28 matches during the 2020–21 season. Olaitan transferred to the French club Niort on 31 January 2022, signing a three-year contract. He made his professional debut with Niort in a 2–0 Ligue 2 win over Quevilly-Rouen, coming on as a late sub in the 84th minute.

International career
Olaitan was born in Benin to a Nigerian father and Beninese mother, and raised in Nigeria. He debuted with the Benin national team in a 1–0 2022 FIFA World Cup qualification win over Madagascar on 2 September 2021.

References

External links
 

2002 births
Living people
People from Porto-Novo
Beninese footballers
Benin international footballers
Beninese people of Nigerian descent
Sportspeople of Nigerian descent
Chamois Niortais F.C. players
Association football midfielders
Ligue 2 players
Benin Premier League players
Beninese expatriate footballers
Beninese expatriates in France
Expatriate footballers in France